American Football League (AFL) on ABC is a television program that broadcast professional football games of the then fledgling (when compared to the more established National Football League) American Football League on the American Broadcasting Company (ABC), then itself a less established player in American network television.  ABC broadcast AFL games from the league's first season in 1960 until the 1964 season, when NBC took over as the league's primary network television broadcaster.

Terms of the deal
On June 9, 1960, the league signed a five-year television contract with ABC, which brought in revenues of approximately $2,125,000 per year for the entire league.  The deal called for ABC to broadcast approximately 37 regular season games, the AFL Championship Game and the AFL All-Star Game.  These games were typically broadcast regionally on 15 consecutive Sundays and on Thanksgiving Day.  This became the first ever cooperative television plan for professional football, in which the proceeds of the contract were divided equally among member clubs; the National Football League would follow suit in 1961, a move that required Congress to pass the Sports Broadcasting Act of 1961 to accommodate such collective broadcasting contracts.

Innovations
ABC and the AFL also introduced moving, on-field cameras (as opposed to the fixed midfield cameras of CBS and the NFL), and were the first to have players "miked" during broadcast games.

List of commentators
Pat Hernon hosted ABC's national postgame show out of New York.  While ABC did show scores and updates from both the AFL and NFL, seldom if ever did viewers see any actual AFL highlights except from the game that had just been broadcast in their region, or nationally.  They however, never showed any actual NFL highlights whatsoever.

Play-by-play
Charlie Brockman (1964)
Jack Buck (1960-1963)
John Ferguson (1960)
Bill Flemming (1964)
Curt Gowdy (1962-1964)
Keith Jackson (1964)
Charlie Jones (1960-1964)
Les Keiter (1960)
Bob Neal (1961)

Color commentary
Elmer Angsman (1960; 1964)
Fred Benners (1960)
Paul Christman (1962-1964)
Dick Danehe (1960)
Bill Dudley (1960)
Lee Giroux (1961)
Johnny Lujack (1964)
Paul Mannaseh (1960)
Jim McKay (1961)
George Ratterman (1960-1964)

References

ABC Sports
National Football League on television
ABC
1960 American television series debuts
1964 American television series endings
American Broadcasting Company original programming
Black-and-white American television shows
Wide World of Sports (American TV series)